Amsterdam Street is a QLINE streetcar station  in Detroit, Michigan. The station opened for service on May 12, 2017, and is located near the southern end of New Center. The station services the northern portion of the campus of Wayne State University and the Ford Piquette Avenue Plant, a museum and former car factory where the first Ford Model Ts were built.

Destinations
 New Amsterdam Historic District
 Our Lady of the Rosary Church
 Piquette Avenue Industrial Historic District
 Wayne State University

Station
The station is sponsored by Ford Motor Company. It is heated and features security cameras and emergency phones. Passenger amenities include Wi-Fi and arrival signs.

See also

Streetcars in North America

References

Tram stops of QLine
Railway stations in the United States opened in 2017
Railway stations in Michigan at university and college campuses